The East Africa Royal Commission was a commission set up by the British government to review issues of economic development in British colonies across British East Africa.

The Commission was established by Royal Warrant on 1 January 1953. It consisted of Hugh Dow, Sally Herbert Frankel, Arthur Gaitskell, Rowland Skeffington Hudson, Daniel Jack and Chief Kidaha Makwa.

It focused on six issues
 economic development through introduction of improved farming methods
 reforming the traditional tribal systems of land tenure
 making more land available for cultivation and settlement 
 finding suitable locations for industrial development
 reviewing conditions of employment in industry, commerce, mining and plantation agriculture in relation to the growth of large urban populations
 the social problems which arise form increased urbanisation and industrialisation

Report
East Africa Royal Commission Report 1953-5

References

British Empire